Mišljenovac is a village in Croatia.

Population

According to the 2011 census, Mišljenovac had 3 inhabitants.

Note: From 1857-1880 data is include in the settlements of Boričevac, Dnopolje and Kruge.

1991 census 

According to the 1991 census, settlement of Mišljenovac had 62 inhabitants, which were ethnically declared as this:

Austro-hungarian 1910 census 

According to the 1910 census, settlement of Mišljenovac had 451 inhabitants in 4 hamlets, which were linguistically and religiously declared as this:

Literature 

  Savezni zavod za statistiku i evidenciju FNRJ i SFRJ, popis stanovništva 1948, 1953, 1961, 1971, 1981. i 1991. godine.
 Knjiga: "Narodnosni i vjerski sastav stanovništva Hrvatske, 1880-1991: po naseljima, autor: Jakov Gelo, izdavač: Državni zavod za statistiku Republike Hrvatske, 1998., ;

References

Populated places in Lika-Senj County